Arkhip is a Russian given name deriving from the Greek name  Archippos "master of horses". Notable people with the name include:

 Arkhip Kuindzhi (1842–1910), Russian-born landscape painter of Greek descent
 Arkhip Lyulka (1908–1984), Soviet scientist and designer of jet engines of Ukrainian origin

See also
 Arkhipov, surname